Hajji Qushan (also Romanized as Ḩājjī Qūshan, Hājjī Qūshan, and Hājī Qūshan; also known as Ḩājī Qūshān Derāz, Ḩājjī Qūsh, and Ḩājjī Qūshāndāz) is a village in Aqabad Rural District, in the Central District of Gonbad-e Qabus County, Golestan Province, Iran. At the 2006 census, its population was 3,717, in 820 families.

The village is mostly known for being the birthplace of famous Turkmen poet, philosopher and Sufi, Magtymguly Pyragy (Feraghi).

References 

Populated places in Gonbad-e Kavus County